Neil M. Westaway,  of Victoria, Australia served as the Chief Commissioner of the Scout Association of Australia, as well as the Chairman of the World Scout Committee and the Chairman of the Board of Scout Resources International (SCORE), replacing Kun-Bae Park.

Westaway began his career as a Cub Scout in Australia. As an adult leader, he became the Victoria State commissioner, the 16th World Scout Jamboree Camp Chief, and is currently a member of the World Scout Foundation.

In October 1999, Westaway was awarded the 281st Bronze Wolf, the only distinction of the World Organization of the Scout Movement, awarded by the World Scout Committee for exceptional services to world Scouting, from King Carl XVI Gustaf of Sweden.

Westaway has worked for the Deloitte consulting firm.

Westaway was appointed an Officer of the Order of Australia (AO) in the 2019 Queen's Birthday Honours for "distinguished service to youth through Scouts at the national and international level, and to the community of Victoria".

References

External links

Recipients of the Bronze Wolf Award
Living people
Year of birth missing (living people)
Scouting and Guiding in Australia
Officers of the Order of Australia